The Service Industry is an Austin, Texas-based pop rock band. They are known for their songs about wage labor and the drudgery of working at blue-collar jobs. They released their debut album, Ranch Is the New French, in 2006, Limited Coverage and Keep the Babies Warm in 2008 and Calm Down in 2010.

Reception
The Austin Chronicles Austin Powell awarded Ranch Is the New French 2.5 stars out of 4. Powell wrote that the band "spits in your food, doesn't wash, and takes smoke breaks every 15 minutes, but also serves up decent indie rock, like the Pixiesish "Not in My Section" and "My Job Is Gay."" Robert Christgau wrote that the album's songs conveyed "Wage servitude and the righteous haters who are stuck in it--the lowdown".

A review of the band's second album, Limited Coverage, in Houston Press concluded that the band "...may have let a little too much of that workplace drudgery leach into their songs, but that's no reason to garnish their wages." The Austin Chronicles Greg Beets gave it 3 out of 4 stars, calling it "the pitch-perfect soundtrack for your next union potluck." Mike Faloon of Razorcake wrote in his review of the album that the band's "...lyrics rarely rise above cliché," while adding that he "kind of like[d] their country rock, especially when Curt Kirkwood of the Meat Puppets guests." Christgau described the album as "A little night music about too many day jobs".

An AllMusic review of the band's third album, Keep the Babies Warm, awarded it 3 stars out of 5. The same review stated that "A little more anger and emotion could make this album a great listen, rather than being merely enjoyable." Beets of the Austin Chronicle gave the album 3 stars out of 4, writing that "the Service Industry's loyal opposition offers catchy commiseration that keeps the glass half full." Adam Newton of Envy criticized the album for featuring too much political commentary.

Jim Caligiuri of the Austin Chronicle gave the band's fourth album, Calm Down, 3 stars out of 4, writing that the album "finds the local crew all over the musical map as ever, skewering modern life with spiked assurance." Benjamin Olivo of My San Antonio also reviewed the album favorably, describing it as "a bouncy delight, sugary and subversive at the same time. It's Nick Lowe sitting in and writing for X."

Discography
Ranch Is the New French (Buildgut, 2006)
Limited Coverage (Sauspop, 2008)
Keep the Babies Warm (Sauspop, 2008)
Calm Down (Sauspop, 2010)

References

External links
Band page at Saustex Records

American pop rock music groups
Musical groups from Austin, Texas
Musical groups established in 2006
American power pop groups
2006 establishments in Texas
Criticism of work